The 79th 24 Hours of Le Mans (French: 79e 24 Heures du Mans) was a 24-hour automobile endurance race for teams of three drivers, each fielding Le Mans Prototype (LMP) and Le Mans Grand Touring Endurance (LMGTE) cars, held before 249,500 spectators on 11 and 12 June 2011 at the Circuit de la Sarthe, near Le Mans, France. It was the third round of the 2011 Intercontinental Le Mans Cup, and the race's 79th edition as organised by the automotive group the Automobile Club de l'Ouest (ACO) since 1923. On April 24, six weeks prior, a test day was held.

An Audi R18 TDI—driven by Marcel Fässler, André Lotterer, and Benoît Tréluyer—started from the pole position, after Tréluyer set the fastest lap in the third qualifying session. The car battled a trio of Peugeot 908s and secured the first Le Mans victory for the drivers, as well as Audi's tenth Le Mans victory. The Peugeot 908 driven by Sébastien Bourdais, Pedro Lamy, and Simon Pagenaud finished second, 13.854 seconds behind, in the race's fourth-closest result; and their teammates Nicolas Minassian, Franck Montagny, and Stéphane Sarrazin completed the podium in third, two laps behind the race-winning Audi.

The Greaves Motorsport team of Tom Kimber-Smith, Olivier Lombard, and Karim Ojjeh won the Le Mans Prototype 2 (LMP2) category, after leading for the race's final 137 laps in a Zytek Z11SN-Nissan car. The trio finished six laps ahead of Signatech Nissan's Oreca 03 vehicle driven by Soheil Ayari, Franck Mailleux, and Lucas Ordóñez, and seven laps in front of Level 5 Motorsports' Lola B08/80 car driven by João Barbosa, Christophe Bouchut, and Scott Tucker. Corvette Racing took their seventh class win—courtesy of drivers Olivier Beretta, Antonio García, and Tommy Milner—finishing first in a Chevrolet Corvette C6.R in the new Le Mans Grand Touring Professional (LMGTE Pro) category. An AF Corse-fielded Ferrari 458 Italia GT2—driven by Gianmaria Bruni, Giancarlo Fisichella, and Toni Vilander—and BMW Motorsport's BMW M3 GT2—driven by Joey Hand, Dirk Müller, and Andy Priaulx—in second and third, respectively, completed the class podium. Larbre Compétition took the first two positions in the new Le Mans Grand Touring Endurance Amateur (LMGTE Am) class with their Chevrolet Corvette C6.R—driven by Patrick Bornhauser, Julien Canal, and Gabriele Gardel—ahead of the sister Porsche 997 GT3-RSR—driven by Jean-Philippe Belloc, Christophe Bourret, and Pascal Gibon.

Audi's victory moved them closer to Peugeot in the LMP1 Manufacturers' Cup while Corvette's class victory moved it past BMW and Ferrari for the LMGTE Manufacturers' Cup lead. Audi Sport Team Joest took over the LMP1 Teams' Cup lead from Peugeot Sport Total, and Larbre overtook Proton Competition for the LMGTE Am Teams' Cup lead. Signatech and AF Corse maintained their advantage in the LMP2 and LMGTE Pro Teams' Cups, respectively, with four rounds remaining in the season.

Background
The 24 Hours of Le Mans began in 1923 when automotive journalist Charles Faroux, the Automobile Club de l'Ouest (ACO) general secretary Georges Durand, and the industrialist Emile Coquile agreed to hold a test of vehicle reliability and durability. The 24 Hours of Le Mans is considered one of the world's most prestigious motor races and is part of the Triple Crown of Motorsport. The race's 79th iteration was held on 11 and 12 June 2011 at the  Circuit de la Sarthe, near Le Mans, France. It was the third of seven automobile endurance races in the 2011 Intercontinental Le Mans Cup.

Peugeot led the LMP1 Manufacturers' Cup with 55 points, 17 ahead of second-place Audi after winning the 1000 km of Spa six weeks earlier. BMW led the LMGTE Manufacturers Cup with 49 points, 11 more than second-placed Ferrari, and 14 more than third-place Corvette. Peugeot Sport led the LMP1 Teams' Cup with 27 points, followed by Audi Sport Team Joest, Team Oreca, and Rebellion Racing, each 19, 18, and 12 points. Signatech Nissan led the LMP2 Teams' Cup with 22 points, and OAK Racing was second with four less. AF Corse led the LMGTE Pro Teams' Cup, with 27 points, followed by BMW Motorsport, with 26 points. Proton Competition led the LMGTE Am standings with 24 points, followed by Krohn Racing with 21 points.

Regulation changes 
The ACO authored the 2011 regulations to respect the environment and support sustainable development by encouraging the use of new technologies and techniques that reduce carbon emissions and fuel consumption. Le Mans Prototype (LMP) cars could now be equipped with four-wheel or kinetic energy recovery system hybrid powertrains, to recover energy otherwise lost by braking, exhaust, or heat generated by the engine and suspension dampers. The ACO reduced fuel capacity for both petrol and diesel vehicles and decreased engine sizes for turbocharged and diesel engines. To reduce lift, all prototype cars had to weigh  and have vertical fins atop the engine cover.

The second-tier Le Mans Prototype 2 (LMP2) category was overhauled to keep costs low and affordable for privateer entries. All LMP2 vehicles had to be equipped with production-series engines, with the required engine life gradually increasing over the following three years from 30 hours to 50 hours. 2010 LMP2 cars could be entered until , but they had to be  heavier than 2011 vehicles, with no bodywork modifications permitted and made slower than all 2011-specification cars. Each LMP2 team had to sign at least one silver- or bronze-rated driver.

The ACO dropped the LM GT1 category and created a single set of regulations for the GT Endurance category, which was divided into two classes: LM GTE Pro and LM GTE Am, based on 2009 LMGT2 rules, This was done to avoid multiple calendar clashes with several racing series and because there were few entrants in the class other than the Le Mans race, as well as the category being exclusively for short-distance sprints. The LM GTE Pro category featured new cars that could be driven by any driver, whereas the LM GTE Am class featured one-year old cars driven by a minimum of two Fédération Internationale de l'Automobile (FIA) silver or bronze licensed drivers per team.

Entries
The ACO received 71 applications by the deadline for entries, 19 January 2011. It granted 56 invitations to the race, and entries were divided between the LMP1, LMP2, LMGTE Pro, and LMGTE Am categories. 40 per cent of the applications were for entry to the LMGTE Am class.

Automatic entries
Teams which won their class in the 2010 24 Hours of Le Mans, or who won Le Mans-based series and events such as the Intercontinental Le Mans Cup (ILMC), the American Le Mans Series (ALMS), the Le Mans Series (LMS), and the Petit Le Mans received automatic entries.  Automatic entries were also granted to some second-place finishers from the 2010 24 Hours of Le Mans and the 2010 LMS. Entries were also given to the LMS Green X Challenge winners. Because teams received automatic entries, they were permitted to change their cars from the previous year to the next, but not their category. Automatic invitations in the two GTE categories could be swapped between the two based on the driver line-ups chosen by those teams. As the ALMS did not differentiate between the Pro and Am categories, only a single GTE invitation was granted to their class champion.

On 3 December 2010, the ACO announced the list of automatic entries.

Entry list and reserves

The ACO announced the full 56-car entry list and 10-vehicle reserve list at a press conference at Radio France's headquarters in Paris, on the afternoon of 9 February, in conjunction with the announcement of entries for the 2011 ILMC, In addition to the 26 full-season entries from the ILMC, the field included ALMS and LMS entries, along with one-off entries competing only at Le Mans. The ACO initially nominated ten reserves: two from LMP1, three from LMP2, and the remaining five from the two LMGTE classes. Withdrawals after 1 February were replaced class-by-class: an LMGTE entry would be replaced by another LMGTE car, and an LMP vehicle replaced by another LMP entry.

Signatech Nissan withdrew its second vehicle, the  27 Oreca 03-Nissan, from the entry list on 12 April. Consequently, the No. 44 Extrême Limite AM Paris Norma MP200P-Judd BMW car was promoted to the entry list; and the Kronos Racing Lola-Aston Martin entry moved to first on the reserve list. The Pegasus Racing and Rangoni Motorsport entries were subsequently removed from the reserve list. The Highcroft Racing team withdrew its LMP1 ARX-01e-Honda car on 16 May, citing a lack of financial support as the reason, while also announcing the end of their partnership with Honda and HPD, due to the 2011 Tōhoku earthquake and tsunami. The Kronos Racing Lola-Aston Martin was then promoted to the entry list. At the start of the event, the No. 69 Robertson Racing Ford GT-R-Doran and the No. 86 Young Driver AMR Vantage were the two cars still on the reserve list.

Testing and practice
For the 2011 race, the test session was reintroduced to Le Mans for the first time since , to allow manufacturers and teams to develop new technologies on their cars. On April 24, seven weeks before the race, two four-hour test sessions were held. During testing, there were 54 cars from the race entry and reserve lists, including three Formula Le Mans-class Oreca-FLM09s from Hope Racing, Genoa Racing, and JMB Racing. The United States-based Flying Lizard Motorsports, Highcroft Racing, and Krohn teams did not participate in the test due to cost and logistics. The European-based JMW Motorsport, Prospeed Competition, Quifel-ASM Team, and Strakka Racing squads also did not participate in the test session.

Romain Dumas set the fastest time in the first test session in the No. 1 Audi R18 TDI—with a lap of 3 minutes, 27.900 seconds. His teammate Tom Kristensen—in the sister No. 3 Audi—improved that time to 3 minutes, 27.687 seconds in the second session. Mike Rockenfeller followed, two-tenths of a seconds behind, in second place, while the fastest Peugeot 908 car was the No. 8 of Stéphane Sarrazin, in third. André Lotterer's No. 2 Audi was fourth, with Sébastien Bourdais's No. 7 Peugeot fifth, and the No. 10 Team Oreca Matmut Peugeot 908 HDi FAP sixth after a lap from Loïc Duval. The fastest non-diesel LMP1 car was Emmanuel Collard's eighth-place No. 16 Pescarolo. The time of 3 minutes, 42.992 seconds set by Franck Mailleux for Signatech led LMP2 with the Oreca-Nissans, ahead of Alexandre Prémat's No. 48 Team Oreca Matmut car and Alex Brundle's No. 41 Greaves Motorsport entry. Allan Simonsen, in the No. 89 Hankook Team Farnbacher Ferrari 458 Italia, was the only driver to go below the 4-minute mark in LMGTE Pro, with a 3 minutes, 59.966 seconds lap to top the class. Tommy Milner helped Larbre Compétition's Chevrolet Corvette C6.R to the lead in LMGTE Am with a 4 minutes, 4.222 seconds lap. Separate incidents led to disruptions during practice: Dominik Kraihamer at Arnage corner, Andrea Belicchi on the Mulsanne Straight with a fractured right-rear toe link, and Guy Smith in the gravel trap at the PlayStation chicane due to a broken front toe link.

Official practice was held on 8 June with the full 56-car field on track for four hours. Audi and Peugeot drivers traded fastest laps until the fastest overall time was a 3 minutes, 27.986 seconds lap set by Rockenfeller's No. 1 Audi, three-tenths of a second ahead of Lotterer's No. 2 entry. Bourdais was the highest-placed Peugeot driver in third, followed by Alexander Wurz's No. 7 vehicle and Allan McNish's No. 3 Audi. Jonny Kane's No. 42 Strakka HPD ARX-01d led LMP2 with a 3 minutes, 42.863 seconds lap, ahead of Prémat's No. 48 Oreca Matumt entry and Signatech's Soheil Ayari. The No. 55 BMW M3 GT2 led LMGTE Pro, with the sister No. 56 vehicle of Andy Priaulx second. Despite a dislodged power steering hose, the fastest non-BMW car was Jan Magnussen's third-place No. 74 Corvette. Fabien Giroix in Gulf AMR Middle East's No. 61 Aston Martin Vantage GT2 lapped fastest in LMGTE Am, ahead of Flying Lizard's No. 81 Porsche 997 GT3-RSR of Darren Law. Raymond Narac's No. 76 IMSA Performance Matmut Porsche was severely damaged against the tyre wall in the Porsche Curves' first part and stopped in the gravel trap, stopping practice for 18 minutes. Roger Wills, driving CRS Racing's No. 62 Ferrari F430 GT2, struck the barrier exiting the Porsche Curves and damaged the car's front-left suspension and radiator, just before mid-point.

Qualifying

The first of three two-hour qualifying sessions began late on a cool and dry June 8 night. Audi led from the start with a flying lap from McNish, followed by Rockenfeller, and then Lotterer leading overall. Sarrazin's 3 minutes, 27.033 seconds lap, set with half an hour remaining, put the No. 8 Peugeot on provisional pole position, which it held to the session's conclusion. The next three positions were taken by a trio of Audis driven by Lotterer, Rockenfeller, and Kristensen. Wurz was the next fastest Peugeot in fifth after being slowed by traffic in the final third of the lap. Bourdais, his teammate, was provisionally sixth. Collard, driving the No. 16 Pescarolo, was eighth among the petrol-powered LMP1 entries. Dumas exited Mulsanne corner at speed and collided side-on with the right-hand corner in the door area of Roald Goethe's stopped No. 60 Aston Martin, which had spun earlier. Both drivers were unhurt, and qualifying was stopped for five minutes. Kane put Strakka's car on provisional pole in LMP2, with a 3 minutes, 42.615 seconds lap almost 40 minutes in, ahead of Mailleux's Singatech, Premat's Oreca Matmut, and Tom Kimber-Smith's Greaves entries. The professional class of LMGTE saw BMW lead with a flying lap from Priaulx in the No. 56 car, ahead of Gianmaria Bruni's No. 51 Ferrari and Augusto Farfus's sister No. 55 BMW, with the first eight separated by 1.572 seconds. Jean-Philippe Belloc helped Porsche top LMGTE Am, ahead of Spencer Pumpelly's Flying Lizard and Giroix's Gulf AMR Middle East's Aston Martin entries.

Strakka reconstructed its car overnight after the first session and changed its programme to allow their drivers to acclimatise to race conditions. The IMSA Performance Porsche was able to resume competitive racing after being transported and rebuilt overnight at the team's headquarters in Rouen, Normandy. Sarrazin improved his provisional pole time to 3 minutes, 26.336 seconds and then to a 3 minutes, 26.156 lap in the second qualifying session. Marcel Fässler then overtook Sarrazin to move the No. 2 Audi to first with a 3 minutes, 25.961 seconds lap which he held until the session ended. The No. 8 Peugeot was demoted to second as the sister No. 7 car improved to third after a lap from Marc Gené. McNish kept Audi's No. 3 entry in fourth, with Dumas' No. 1 car falling to fifth and Franck Montagny staying sixth for the No. 9 Peugeot team. Ayari reset LMP2's quickest lap time to a 3 minutes, 41.458 seconds time for Signatech. Premat improved the Oreca Matmut car while Pierre Kaffer moved the Pecom Lola-Judd vehicle to second and third in class, respectively. In LMGTE Pro, AF Corse led the session and claimed provisional pole position with Bruni's quickest class lap, demoting Jörg Müller's No. 55 BMW. Similarly, AF Corse's No. 61 Ferrari of Marco Cioci improved the LMGTE Am pole position lap, with Horst Felbermayer Jr moving the Felbermayr-Proton Porsche to second in class. During the session, which saw several cars affected by mechanical issues, Priaulx lost control of the No. 56 BMW at the Ford Chicane, after possibly driving over debris or gravel, and crashed into the outside tyre barrier.

In the third session, Dumas, in the No. 1 Audi, bettered the No. 2 car's provisional pole lap before Benoît Tréluyer reset the fastest time to a 3 minutes, 25.738 seconds, achieving Audi's first overall pole position at Le Mans since . Dumas gained the No. 1 entry to join Tréluyer's No. 2 vehicle on the grid's front row while Simon Pagenaud qualified the No. 9 Peugeot third. Nicolas Minassian put the No. 8 Peugeot fourth, Kristensen qualified the No. 3 Audi fifth, with the No. 7 Peugeot of Anthony Davidson sixth. Early in the session, Davidson spun the No. 7 Peugeot in the Ford Chicane before Kristensen lost control of the No. 3 Audi upon a kerb and crashed in the Tetre Rouge gravel trap. Signatech's second-session lap did not improve on Ayari's lap; and Ayari thus secured the LMP2 pole position. Kane's lap time could not be bettered by his Strakka team, so it started second in the category, with Oreca Matmut beginning third. Farfus improved the LMGTE Pro pole lap, and the No. 55 BMW led the class until the session's conclusion. The No. 51 Ferrari began from second, as the No. 56 BMW fell to third after not being able to partake in the session, following Priaulx's second-session accident. Cioci lapped faster to earn AF Corse the inaugural LMGTE Am pole position. The session was halted for 20 minutes when Anthony Beltoise crashed the No. 58 Luxury Racing Ferrari at Mulsanne Corner after hitting oil and Christian Klien, in the No. 009 Aston Martin AMR-One, picked up a left-rear puncture, prompting the laying of cement dust on the racing line.

Qualifying results
Pole position winners in each class are indicated in bold. The fastest time set by each entry is denoted in gray.

Warm-up
A 45-minute warm-up session took place at 09:00 local time on 11 June in cloudy conditions without rain. Bourdais' No. 9 Peugeot set the fastest lap—3 minutes, 27.228 seconds—just before the session's end. Tréluyer was second-fastest, with his Audi teammates Timo Bernhard and Kristensen third and fourth. Mallieux's Signatech entry led LMP2 with a 3 minutes, 43.449 seconds lap. AF Corse's LMGTE Pro Ferrari of Toni Vilander led that class, while Niclas Jönsson's Krohn Ferrari led LMGTE Am. Rui Águas stopped AF Corse's No. 71 Ferrari at Mulsanne corner with a suspected differential issue. Kaffer continued straight on at the Arnage turn and restarted the Pecom car to continue his race preparations.

Race

Start to early evening

The race began with a rolling start at 15:00 local time, with FIA President Jean Todt waving the French Tricolour from the starter's gantry in front of 249,500 spectators. Tréluyer led the 56-car field for the first ten laps. His teammate McNish passed Bourdais for fourth before the Mulsanne Straight and Montagny on the outside at the PlayStation chicane after a five-lap duel that saw Montagny put McNish towards the pit lane wall. Aston Martin Racing lost both of its LMP1-class AMR Ones during the first hour when Darren Turner beached the No. 009 car in the first Mulsanne chicane gravel and Adrián Fernández brought the No. 007 car into the garage with unrepairable broken engine aluminium alternator pulleys breaking the pulley-linked drive alternator and water pump gear. Bruni moved Ferrari's No. 51 car to the LMGTE Pro lead followed by Oliver Gavin's No. 74 Corvette in second after passing Farfus which he held until Farfus reclaimed the position.

Mallieux's Signatech car forfeited the LMP2 lead it had held since the start, to Prémat's No. 48 Oreca entry after 34 minutes, due to a left-rear puncture that damaged the bodywork. The first hour ended with McNish passing Bernhard's slowing No. 1 Audi for the lead on the inside, past the Dunlop Bridge, before Beltoise was caught off guard and collided with the rear of the No. 3 car in the high speed right-hand Esses. McNish went backwards through the gravel, striking the outside tyre wall at high speed, through a gap designed allow cars to be moved to a safer location beyond the gravel, and landing upside down on its side. The impact destroyed the Audi and sent debris flying through the inside catch fence across a group of photographers. McNish was unhurt as the marshals turned the Audi upright. He was transported to the infield medical centre and then to a local hospital for tests that cleared him. The safety cars were deployed for 72 minutes as marshals worked to repair the damaged walls. Under safety car conditions, Montagny brought the No. 8 Peugeot into the garage earlier than scheduled to rectify a stuck vehicle brake-balance distribution unit in the rearmost area, and it rejoined the race in eighth with Sarrazin driving.

When racing resumed, Nick Tandy's No. 88 Felbermayr Porsche lapped faster than Corvette's Olivier Beretta and overtook him for second in LMGTE Pro. Tréluyer maintained the lead until a pit stop cycle saw his teammate Bernhard temporarily move past him, as the cars made pit stops in numerical order. Bernhard had driven over a kerb, damaging the No. 1 Audi's nose line while lapping a slower GT car, reducing the amount of available downforce. Following separate overtakes on the Mulsanne Straight, Tréluyer and Wurz demoted Bernhard to third. Bernhard fell to fifth after Audi brought the No. 1 car into the pit lane for a replacement front nose. LMP2 became a duel for first between Prémat and, later, Kraihamer's Oreca and Danny Watts' Strakka car, which was gaining on the Oreca. Jörg Müller No. 55 BMW's lost third in LMGTE Pro, due to a right-rear puncture that required it to enter the garage, dropping him two laps behind the class leader. Pagenaud lost control of the No. 9 Peugeot and went straight at Arnage turn, forcing him to steer the car around to rejoin the circuit.

Davidson took the lead in the No. 7 Porsche from Fässler's No. 2 Audi, since his car could go longer between pit stops. Dumas was recovering lost ground in the No. 1 Audi when he lost control while lapping the LMGTE Am-category No. 71 Porsche on the inside at Tetre Rouge; he maintained the car's hold on fourth. AF Corse lost third in LMGTE Pro to Antonio García's No. 73 Corvette because Vilander required trackside recovery to return his Ferrari to the circuit after going into the gravel trap at Mulsanne Corner. Matías Russo overtook Leventis's Strakka car for third in LMP2. Davidson's No. 7 Peugeot and Fässler's No. 2 Audi exchanged the race lead during the sixth hour, until Fässler was able to establish a minute's lead over the rest of the field. Due to the length of the track, the distance between the LMGTE Am class leader and sixth in category became just over a minute, involving the Flying Lizard, Krohn, AF Corse, and Larbre teams.

Night to dawn
As night began to fall, Rockenfeller in the No. 1 Audi overtook Lamy in the No. 9 Peugeot for third place after Lamy's car had been affected by a door repeatedly flapping open, as Lotterer and Gené continued to duel for the race lead. Priaulx relinquished the No. 56 BMW's hold on second in LMGTE Pro, due to an engine misfire requiring changing the engine control unit and ignition coil. LMGTE Am saw the two Larbre entries—the No. 70 Corvette and the No. 50 Porsche—duel for the category lead with the Corvette consistently lapping faster than the Porsche. Gené fell back from Lotterer in the duel for the overall lead; and the No. 7 Peugeot was put under pressure by Rockenfeller's No. 1 Audi, which took second by causing Gené to drift wide onto the Arnage corner run-off area and lose 30 seconds in the eighth hour. Not long after, Rockenfeller was lapping the No. 71 Ferrari of Rob Kauffman at the second kink on the straight linking Mulsanne and the Indianapolis corner, when Kauffman drove into Rockenfeller's path and made contact with the rear of the No. 1 Audi. The ACO ordered Kauffman to not partake in the remainder of the race, and Rockenfeller was kept in hospital overnight with a minor flesh wound to his right arm.

The safety cars were deployed for the second time, for 2 hours, 22 minutes, to allow marshals to repair the damaged Armco barrier and remove debris. All of the leading prototype cars were driven into the pit lane for full-service pit stops. CRS brought their No. 62 Ferrari into the garage for new tyres, due to driver Shaun Lynn heavily damaging the vehicle's right-rear corner against the Ford Chicane barrier after losing control turning into the corner. The resulting damage included bodywork jamming the right-rear wheel against the fuel cell, causing an oil leak that was repaired by Lynn before the car's clutch burned out. When racing resumed, the sole remaining No. 2 Audi and the three Peugeots exchanged the lead several times over the following hours during pit stop cycles. Prémat relinquished the LMP2 lead, which the No. 48 Oreca had maintained for 96 laps, to the Greaves entry of Olivier Lombard, because of electrical issues that forced the Oreca's moving to the garage. The battle for second place in the LMGTE classes saw four drivers within twelve seconds of each other in Pro and three competitors within three seconds of one another in Am. Watts moved the Strakka LMP2 car to second in category, with successive overtakes of Russo and Kraihamer.

Two cars that were among the top three in LMP2 retired. Russo lost control of the third-place Pecom car in the Porsche Curves, when it suddenly drove right into the barrier. Watts' Strakka entry struck a kerb and damaged the car's front aerodynamics. Before Watts smelled oil and stopped the car at the first Mulsanne chicane due to a suspected oil cooler issue, a front nose cone change during pit stop fixed the problem. Watts abandoned the car after telemetry determined that it should not be restarted. Kraihamer was lapping faster than Karim Ojjeh's No. 41 Greaves car and overtook him to reclaim the LMP2 lead in the No. 48 Oreca since he had made one fewer pit stop. When the Nos. 7 and 8 Peugeots exchanged third overall during a pit stop cycle, Ayari's Singatech car passed João Barbosa and for third in LMP2. Pagenaud and his teammate Davidson closed up to Fässler's No. 2 Audi and took first and second just before the third deployment of the safety cars. Jean-Christophe Boullion substantially damaged the front of the No. 13 Rebellion in an accident at the Porsche Curves but he was unhurt. Marshals removed the vehicle and cleaned up the wreckage.

As racing continued in the early morning, the first three entries were all close together. Fässler moved from third to first after a pit stop cycle, but lost the lead when Davidson overtook him on the inside entering Indianapolis corner. Davidson flat-spotted the No. 7 Peugeot's front wheels at the first Mulsanne chicane while under pressure from Fässler through the Porsche Curves, allowing Fässler to reclaim the lead. The safety cars were deployed for the fourth time when Christophe Bourret beached the No. 70 Larbre Porsche on the edge of the gravel in the Porsche Curves and reversed back onto the track. Stéphane Ortelli then stopped the No. 59 Ferrari on the track and required assistance from marshals and trackside equipment for recovery. David Hallyday damaged the front-right corner of the No. 48 Oreca LMP2 entry at Arnage corner while attempting to maintain tyre temperature. Hallyday abandoned the car on the run-off area during the safety car period. The Oreca's retirement promoted Mallieux's No. 28 Signatech car to second in LMP2 and Christophe Bouchut's No. 33 Level 5 Motorsports entry to third in category.

Morning to finish

Beretta, who was combating carbon monoxide poisoning from inhaling fumes during previous safety car periods, missed his braking point for Arnage corner and damaged the No. 73 Corvette's front-end against the turn's tyre barrier. He reversed the car and rejoined the circuit, retaining third in LMGTE Pro. Seth Neiman's No. 81 Flying Lizard Porsche ran wide into the gravel at Mulsanne, requiring him to temporarily relinquish the LMGTE Am lead to Gabriele Gardel's No. 50 Larbre, when Neiman entered the garage with liquids leaking from the car's rear. Pumpelly then relieved Neiman, losing a battle with Gardel for the category lead. Magnussen, driving Corvette's No. 73 LMGTE Pro–leading car, was lapping Horst Felbermayr's No. 63 LMGTE Am Proton Porsche on the inside when he lost control of his car's rear. He collided with the side of Felbermayr's car, sending both vehicles into the barriers. The Corvette and Porsche were both forced to retire due to the accident; and Vilander's No. 51 Ferrari moved to the LMGTE Pro lead, with Beretta's No. 63 Corvette second.

The safety cars were deployed for the fifth time. Marshals spent 29 minutes clearing debris in the accident area, and recovery vehicles were used to extricate the damaged vehicles. Following the resumption of racing, the No. 7 and 8 Peugeots were released from the pit lane a lap before the No. 2 Audi of Tréluyer that was at the back of the nearest safety car's queue. Pagenaud took the race lead from Tréluyer before the latter was able to reclaim the position on the outside, entering the second Mulsanne chicane and pulling away with a series of fastest laps. The No. 8 Peugeot of Sarrazin received a one-minute stop-and-go penalty because the team member holding the refueling hose had an incorrectly placed visor when adding fuel to the car., losing a lap to the race leader. In the 19th hour, Wurz missed the apex for Indianapolis corner and went straight on and minor contact with the tyre barrier exiting the turn damaged the No. 7 Peugeot's front-left corner and right-front wheel. The car was extricated by a tractor and driven to the garage, where it lost four laps to the race leaders while its front suspension was repaired.

To end the 19th hour, light rain began to fall on parts of the circuit and quickly increased in intensity, though not enough to disrupt the race. Tréluyer approached the rear of the lapped Davidson and could not lap the No. 7 Peugeot because it blocked his path and removed downforce from Audi's No. 2 car. Audi instructed Tréluyer to slow and not put another lap on Davidson. Lotterer replaced Tréluyer during a routine pit stop before the No. 2 Audi was slowed by another Peugeot, this time by Montagny's No. 8 entry, before being lapped at Mulsann turne. Due to clutch and electrical issues, Vilander was unable to immediately restart the No. 51 Ferrari at its pit box, giving García's No. 73 Corvette the LMGTE Pro lead. Rain returned to the track during the 22nd hour, and some cars were caught out by the change in conditions. Kimber-Smith lost control of the Greaves Zytek car at the Dunlop S and was temporarily beached in the gravel before recovering with assistance and maintaining his LMP2 lead. Collard retired the fifth-place No. 16 Pescarolo 01 after crashing into the tyre barrier entering the Porsche Curves.

In the 23rd hour, Lotterer was delayed by the fourth-place Gené, whom he was attempting to lap; and the two drivers made contact going into the second chicane on the Mulsanne Straight. Lotterer was able to lap Gené after the Mulsanne turn. Robertson Racing's No. 68 Ford GT was promoted to third in LMGTE Am after the JMB Racing Ferrari had to twice enter the garage for clutch repairs. The circuit had become completely dry by the final hour's start. Lotterer was forced to make an extra pit stop to receive four new tyres, and fuel, with fewer than 40 minutes remaining, after Audi noticed the No. 2 car's left-rear tyre was slowly deflating. Race control decided that instead of the traditiona slow lap with marshals waving flags, a full lap at slow speed would take place after the race was over. Pascale Gibson, driving the second-place LMGTE Am Larbre Porsche, collided with a tyre wall but recovered without losing his position.

Lotterer was able to pull way from the No. 9 Peugeot by responding to the car's fast pace in the final half-hour; and the No. 2 Audi was the first to finish, after 355 laps, achieving the first Le Mans win for Lotterer, Fässler, and Tréluyer, and Audi's tenth. Their lead engineer, Leena Gade, was the first female race engineer to win the event. In the fourth-closest recorded Le Mans finish, Pagenaud's No. 9 Peugeot came in second 13.854 seconds later. The No. 8 Peugeot, driven by the headache-affected and visually impaired Minassian, due to overnight car vibrations, finished two laps behind in third place. Greaves was undaunted for the final 137 laps in LMP2; and drivers Kimber-Smith, Lombard, and Ojjeh claimed their first class wins as well as Nissan's first since . Signatech were six laps behind in second, and Level 5 took third in their Le Mans debut. Corvette Racing held their lead in LMGTE Pro, earning the team their seventh category win, Milner's maiden class victory, García's fourth, and Beretta's sixth. The No. 51 Ferrari took AF Corse's first Le Mans class podium in second place, and BMW's No. 56 car was third. Corvette also won in LMGTE Am, with Larbre achieving their sixth category win with the No. 50 entry, ahead of the sister No. 70 Corvette and Robertson's Ford GT. On David and Andrea Robertson's wedding anniversary, the two became the first married couple to finish on the podium.

Post-race

The top three teams from each of the four classes were presented with trophies on the podium and spoke to the media at press conferences. Fässler described his emotions as he watched his co-drivers battle Peugeot in the closing stages: "In the last five hours I was in the pits with everybody, standing by the car when it came in. I didn't know where we were going in the rain. I know how difficult it is to drive a car like this on slicks in the rain." Bourdais conceded Peugeot lost to a slightly stronger, quicker, and more reliable Audi squad; and his teammate Pagenaud preferred to have been the driver being caught, adding: "It was more difficult to finish second by only 13 seconds because it was such a tough battle." Davidson denied employing gamesmanship against Lotterer, saying he had not received a team order and acted on his own initiative. He also said he did not deliberately collide with Lotterer and that the closed-cockpit Peugeot allowed him to only observe the latter whilst braking.

McNish was advised not to travel, so he could recover from body trauma. He praised the strength of the Audi, and said of the first-hour accident that led to the No. 3 car's retirement: "Obviously, it was a very big accident. I think everybody realises that. I've been banged around a little bit, but the biggest thing is a little bit of pain in the bottom of my back and a big graze around my shin. Considering the impact, the speed and everything else, I think we all got away quite fortunate." Beltoise said he did not observe McNish approaching his Ferrari from behind and was "very surprised" by the incident. Rockenfeller praised car safety standards following his accident with Kauffman, saying: "The safety standards at Audi are simply incredible and have saved my life. I've never had such an accident before in my career and hope I'll never have such an experience again." Audi team principal Wolfgang Ullrich said that the closed-cockpit vehicle design did not provide as wide a view as from an open-cockpit car but denied that the team's two major race accidents were caused by visibility-related issues.

Kimber-Smith stated that Greaves's race-long low-risk strategy had proved fruitful, adding: "There's a perception that you always have to be fast, but in LMP2 you also have to finish and that's exactly what we did." His teammate Lombard described the team's victory as "truly exceptional", having tested the car just once, saying: "It was a delight for me and even though there was fatigue and stress I thought I coped well. Hopefully this success can be the start of things, maybe even a driver for next year as well." Milner described his LMGTE Pro victory as "the hardest drive of my life" and said the changeable conditions would have made it easier. Beretta stated that he became ill inhaling exhaust gas during a safety car period and that Corvette faced a challenge: "We had a lot of pressure and we just pushed as hard as we could. I think we really deserve the victory." Doug Fehan, Corvette Racing's general manager, commented: "If I were to write a script to celebrate the 100th anniversary of Chevrolet and the 10th anniversary of Corvette Racing's first win at Le Mans, this would undoubtedly be it."

Peugeot maintained its lead in the LMP1 Manufacturers' Cup lead with 103 points, ahead of Audi with 69 points. Corvette's class victory moved them to the top of the LMGTE Manufactuers' Cup with 84 points, ahead of Ferrari and BMW, who both had 72 points. Audi Sport Team Joest overtook Peugeot Sport to lead the LMP1 Teams' Cup, while Signatech and AF Corse retained the LMP2 and LMGTE Pro Teams' Cups, respectively. Larbre passed Proton Competition to lead the LMGTE Am Teams' Cup with four rounds remaining in the 2011 ILMC season.

Race classification
Class winners are marked in bold. Cars failing to complete 70 per cent of winner's distance (249 laps) are marked as Not Classified (NC).

Championship standings after the race

References

External links
 

24 Hours of Le Mans races
Le Mans
Le Mans
Le Mans